is a former member of the Japanese idol girl group HKT48. She was a member of HKT48's Team H.

Biography

Career
Anai passed HKT48's 1st generation auditions in July 2011. Her audition song was "Haru ni Nattara" by Miwa. Her stage debut was in November 2011. In March 2012, she was selected to form Team H and was also appointed captain.  In the 2014 AKB48 general elections, Anai ranked for the first time, placing 39th with 18,825 votes. On June 8, 2016, during an HKT48 stage greeting, Anai announced she was leaving the group.

Character
Anai's nickname at the point of debut was "Chiichan", but was later changed to "Chihiron". However, she is still called "Chiichan" by members. She is also often referred to as "Kyappu", which is derived from captain, since she was appointed the captain of Team H when it was formed.

Anai likes pumpkins and tomatoes, but dislikes avocados. She studied classical ballet throughout elementary and middle school.  Anai admires Yuko Oshima, and respects Minami Takahashi and Rino Sashihara.

Discography

HKT48 singles

AKB48 singles

Appearances

Stage Units
HKT48 Kenkyuusei Stage "Te wo Tsunaginagara"
 "Ame no Pianist"

HKT48 Team H 1st Stage "Te wo Tsunaginagara"
 "Kono Mune no Barcode"

Team H Waiting Stage "Hakata Legend"
 "Heart Gata Virus"
 "Enkyori Poster"

HKT48 Himawarigumi 1st Stage "Pajama Drive"
 "Junjou Shugi"

Team H 2nd Stage "Seishun Girls"
 "Blue rose"
 "Fushidara na Natsu"
 "Cinderella wa Damasarenai"
 "Kinjirareta Futari"

Team H 3rd Stage "Saishuu Bell ga Naru"
 "Return Match"
 "Oshibe to Meshibe to Yoru no Chouchou"

Variety 
 HKT48 no Odekake!
 Hakata Hyakkaten
 Nogizaka46 x HKT48 Crown Program Battle

Movies 
 Himitsu

References

External links
 
 Chihiro Anai on Google+

1996 births
Living people
Japanese idols
Japanese women pop singers
Musicians from Fukuoka Prefecture
HKT48 members
21st-century Japanese women singers
21st-century Japanese singers